Charlotte Schlesinger (1909-1976) was a German pianist and composer.

She was a student of Franz Schreker at the Berlin Hochschule für Musik from 1925-1930. In 1935 she left the Vienna Conservatory to teach at the Ukrainian S.S.S.R. Conservatory.

Schlesinger migrated to America as a refugee in 1938. She taught piano at Black Mountain College from fall 1946 through spring 1949, when she resigned along with several other faculty, including Theodore Dreier, Josef Albers, Anni Albers, and Trude Guermonprez.

She went on to teach for many years at the Wilson School of Music in Yakima, Washington.

Recordings
 EntArteOper Festival - Kammermusik & Lieder  songs : Es ziehen die Reihe lang; Wie hell das Licht mir scheinet; Was hör ich - on recital  Hermine Haselböck (soprano)

References

German women composers
1909 births
1976 deaths
Black Mountain College faculty